TERF is an acronym for  radical feminist. First recorded in 2008, the term was originally used to distinguish transgender-inclusive feminists from a group of radical feminists who reject the assertion that trans women are women, the inclusion of trans women in women's spaces, and transgender rights legislation. Trans-inclusive feminists assert that these ideas are transphobic. The use of the term TERF has since broadened to include reference to people with trans-exclusionary views who are not necessarily involved with radical feminism.

Though TERF was created to be a "deliberately technically neutral description", the term is now typically considered derogatory or disparaging. People labeled TERFs often reject the label, instead describing their beliefs as gender critical. In academic discourse, there is no clear consensus on whether TERF constitutes a slur. Critics of the label have pointed to its usage alongside insulting or abusive rhetoric, and described it as a "bullying tool", while other academics have argued that this alone does not make it a slur.

Origin  
Trans-inclusive cisgender radical feminist blogger Viv Smythe has been credited with creating and popularizing the term in 2008 as an online shorthand.

Smythe coined the term, due to a blog post she wrote reacting to the Michigan Womyn's Music Festival's policy of denying admittance to trans women. She wrote that she rejected the alignment of all radical feminists with "trans-exclusionary radfem (TERF) activists". It was used to describe a minority of feminists who espouse sentiments that other feminists consider transphobic, including the rejection of the view predominant in feminist organizations that trans women are women, opposition to transgender rights, and the exclusion of trans women in women's spaces and organizations. In a 2014 interview with Cristan Williams of The TransAdvocate blog, Smytheusing her net-pseudonym "TigTog"said:

Usage  
Smythe initially used TERF to refer to a particular type of feminist whom she characterized as "unwilling to recognise trans women as sisters" but notes that the term has taken on additional connotations and that it has been "weaponised at times" by both inclusionary and exclusionary groups. The term has since become an established part of the contemporary feminist language but its usage is contested.

Several writers have observed that TERF can be used in broader senses to refer to trans-exclusionary feminists who are not radical, people with a certain kind of trans-exclusionary politics regardless of whether they are radical feminists or even things that are culturally associated with second-wave feminism in general.

The Oxford English Dictionary (OED) added an entry for TERF (noun) in June 2022, which states that although the term was first intended as a neutral descriptor, it is "now typically regarded as derogatory". OED editor Fiona McPherson explained that because "there is a little bit more nuance behind its usageit's not always just a straight-out insult", the dictionary's editors opted to explain this rather than simply label the term "derogatory" or "chiefly derogatory".

Slur debate  
People that have TERF directed at them often characterize it as a pejorative or hate speech. In a July 2018 solicitation of essays regarding "transgender identities", British magazine The Economist required writers to "avoid all slurs, including TERF", stating that the word was used to try to silence opinions and sometimes incite violence. In August 2018, seven British philosophers wrote on the website Daily Nous that two articles by Veronica Ivy and Jason Stanley published in the journal Philosophy and Phenomenological Research normalized the term. They described the term as "at worst a slur and at best derogatory", and argued that it had been used to denigrate those "who disagree with the dominant narrative on trans issues". In response, Ernest Sosa, the journal's editor in chief, stated that scholars consulted by the journal advised that the term could become a slur at some point, but that its use as a denigrating term in some contexts did not mean that it could not be used descriptively.

Transgender rights activists generally but not always disagree that the term is a slur. Transgender author Andrea Long Chu described the claim that TERF was a slur as "a grievance that would be beneath contempt if it weren't also true, in the sense that all bywords for bigots are intended to be defamatory."

Linguists and philosophers of language have been skeptical of the idea that the term TERF is a slur. Transgender rights activist and philosophy of language professor Veronica Ivy argues that just because the word could be used pejoratively, it did not mean it was a slur in general. In a 2020 paper published in the philosophy journal Grazer Philosophische Studien, linguists Christopher Davis and Elin McCready argued that three properties could make a term a slur: it had to be derogatory towards a particular group, used to subordinate them within some structure of power relations and that the derogated group must be defined by an intrinsic property. Davis and McCready wrote that the term TERF satisfied the first condition, but failed the third condition, and that the second condition was contentious, in that it depended upon how each group saw itself in relation to the other group. Philosophy of language professor Jennifer Saul disagreed with categorizing TERF as a slur, arguing that a term does not necessarily become a slur when coupled with violent or abusive rhetoric. However, she argued that the term is inaccurate because not all people described as TERFs could reasonably be considered feminists, preferring the term "anti-trans activists" instead.

Other feminist philosophers have differing opinions on the term. Feminist philosopher Talia Mae Bettcher argued that, regardless of whether the term was accurately classified as a slur, it "has at least become offensive to those designated by the term", which suggested it might be best to avoid "in case one wants to have a conversation across deep difference". Feminist philosopher Judith Butler disputed that the term TERF was a slur in an interview with New Statesman, saying "I wonder what name self-declared feminists who wish to exclude trans women from women's spaces would be called? If they do favour exclusion, why not call them exclusionary? If they understand themselves as belonging to that strain of radical feminism that opposes gender reassignment, why not call them radical feminists?"

Rejection of term by gender-critical feminists  
Feminist people labeled as TERFs generally object to the term and may refer to themselves as gender critical. In 2017, British columnist Sarah Ditum wrote that "the bar to being called a 'terf' is remarkably low", citing PinkNewss criticism of Woman's Hour presenter Jenni Murray and a Medium writer's blog entry about Nigerian novelist Chimamanda Ngozi Adichie.

In a 2015 article, American feminist scholar Bonnie J. Morris argued that TERF was initially a legitimate analytical term, but quickly developed into a defamatory word associated with sexist insults. She described the word as "emblematic of the unresolved tensions between our LGBT community's L and T factions" and called on scholars and journalists to stop using it.

British journalist Catherine Bennett has described the word as "a bullying tool", which had "already succeeded in repressing speechand maybe even research". In 2017, British feminist author Claire Heuchan argued that the word was often used alongside "violent rhetoric", and that this violent language was used to "dehumanise women who are critical of gender as part of a political system", often lesbians. British clinical psychologist and medical sociologist David Pilgrim says that phrases like "Kill a TERF!" or "Punch a TERF!" are also posted by trolls online, and that there had been other depictions of violence aimed at women labeled as TERFs.

The 2018 United Kingdom All Party Parliamentary Group (APPG) on Hate Crime received several submissions that indicated a high degree of tension between trans activists and feminist groups opposed to transgender rights legislation, with both sides detailing incidents of extreme or abusive language. The report noted that some women had submitted reports which argued that "women who object to the inclusion of trans women as female are being attacked both online and, in the street, with the term 'trans-exclusionary radical feminist' or 'TERF' being used as a term of abuse."

Some people who have been called trans-exclusionary radical feminists say that trans-exclusionary is an inaccurate label, as they are inclusive of transgender men, who have a female sex assignment. Peter Cava notes that when these feminists are inclusive of trans men, they often gender them as women. Linguists Christopher Davis and Elin McCready view this "purported support" of trans men as a denial of their agency and self-determination, and suggest it is trans-exclusionary "because it excludes the very category of 'trans man.

See also  

 Anti-gender movement
 Feminist theory
 Feminist views on transgender topics
 Gender essentialism
 Lesbian erasure in relation to transgender women
 Radical feminist views on transgender topics
 Social construction of gender
 Transmisogyny
 Womyn-born womyn

References

External links 

 
 

2008 neologisms
Acronyms
Discrimination against transgender people
English words
Feminism and transgender
Feminist movements and ideologies
Feminist terminology
LGBT-related controversies
LGBT slang
Linguistic controversies
Radical feminism
Transphobia
Women-related neologisms